Zuzana Zlochová (born 24 January 1990) is a Slovakian professional tennis player.

Zlochová made her WTA Tour main-draw debut at the 2021 Swedish Open in the singles tournament, and in the doubles main draw, partnering Karman Thandi.
 
In 2011, she lost her singles final at Solin in Dalmatia to Croatian Dijana Banoveć. In 2013, Zlochová won the doubles tournament in Adana, Turkey.

In 2014, Zlochová was awarded the Crystal Peacock Award.

ITF Finals

References

External links
 
 

1990 births
Living people
Slovak female tennis players
21st-century Slovak women